U.S. Route 158 (US 158) is an east–west United States highway that runs for  from Mocksville to Whalebone Junction in Nags Head, entirely in the state of North Carolina. It is also a critical route that connects the cities of Winston-Salem, Summerfield, and Reidsville with one another.

Route description

US 158 is a parallel of U.S. Route 58 (which runs generally through southern Virginia). The route does not intersect its parent, instead intersecting its sibling, US 258. A  stretch skirts the Great Dismal Swamp.

In Mocksville, it begins and heads north of the US 64/US 601 junction, through the downtown area. Out of town, it turns northeasterly, following in parallel to Interstate 40 (I-40) to Winston-Salem. In the city the route uses the name Stratford Road which is an arterial thoroughfare which enters into a busy commercial district and it passes two folded diamond junctions 
with Interstate 40 and the expressway Silas Creek Parkway (NC 67). US 158 leaves the road to merge with the freeway Salem Parkway (US 421) for a short concurrency through the downtown area. Just east of town, it leaves US 421 and turns roughly north, closely paralleling nearby US 311, heading into Walkertown where both routes intersect NC 66. Here, Motorists can use NC 66 to connect between US 158 and US 311 within town. It then passes through Belews Creek, taking on a northeasterly path and effectively bypassing the Kernersville area, and passes thru Stokesdale where it meets two more NC Highways, NC 65, and NC 68. Shortly after, it passes through the north part of Summerfield, intersecting Interstate 73 (which carries U.S. Route 220 along it). It then leads further east to Reidsville, where it links to US 29 Business.  From Reidsville, US 158 connects the northern counties of North Carolina, going through the cities and towns of Yanceyville, Roxboro, Oxford, Henderson, Roanoke Rapids, Murfreesboro, and Elizabeth City.

From North Carolina Highway 168 (NC 168) eastward, it carries traffic from the Norfolk region to the Outer Banks. Most of the route is otherwise a four-lane divided highway with a  speed limit until NC 168 (which carries traffic to Chesapeake, Virginia), where it turns left at an at-grade intersection. It then returns to being undivided.

In Dare County, the highway runs in a north–south direction, although it is signed west–east. It acts as a bypass route for the Virginia Dare Trail (NC 12), which runs parallel to US 158 to the east.  For the entire length of the Outer Banks, US 158 is known as Croatan Highway.

History
US 158 was established in 1932, as a concurrency with NC 48 from Mocksville to Murfreesboro and NC 12, from Murfreesboro to Virginia state line.  US 158 also replaced US 117 routing between Murfreesboro to Franklin, Virginia.  In 1934, NC 48 and NC 12 were removed from its routing.  In 1937 or 1938, US 158's western terminus moved from Depot Street to Main Street in Mocksville. In 1941, US 158 swapped routes with NC 65 between Stokesdale and Reidsville.  Also in the same year, US 158 was rerouted east at Murfreesboro, replacing NC 30 to Camden and NC 34 crossing the Croatan Sound and ending at NC 345, near Manteo; its old alignment north of Murfreesboro became part of US 258.  Between 1945-1949, US 158's western terminus moved to its current location at Main and Lexington Streets, in Mocksville; also in same time period, US 158 was moved onto new routing through Roxboro; its old alignment along Main Street became US 501A.  In 1946, US 158 bypassed north of Gatesville, with its old alignment became US 158A.

Around 1951, US 158 was removed from Roanoke Island and was truncated at its current eastern terminus at Whalebone Junction, on Bodie Island; its former routing was replaced by US 64/US 264.  In 1951, US 158 was placed on new bypass north of Henderson, leaving behind US 158A along its old alignment.  Around 1954, US 158 was placed on one-way streets in downtown Winston-Salem: westbound via Clover Dale Street, Glade Street and fifth street; eastbound via first and fourth streets.  In 1955, US 158 was bypassed north of Warrenton, leaving behind US 158A along its former alignment.

In 1959, US 158 was moved onto new expressway between Stratford to Marshall and Cherry Streets, in Winston-Salem.  In 1960, US 158 was moved onto its current routing in Bodie Island, leaving behind US 158 Business.

By 1962, US 158 had completed its transition onto the freeway in Winston-Salem, leaving behind US 158 Business.  Between 1963-1967, US 158 was routed onto one-way streets in Weldon.  In 1968, US 158 was rerouted in Elizabeth City.

In 1971, US 158 was placed onto the Yanceyville bypass; its old routing through the downtown area was partly replaced by NC 62, with Main Street downgraded to secondary road.  In 1973, US 13/US 158 was placed on new western bypass of Winton, its old alignment became part of NC 45.  In 1979, US 158 was placed on bypass north of Reidsville, via US 29 Bus. and NC 14; its old alignment became mostly secondary roads, with just part remaining as NC 87.  In 1984, US 17/US 158 was rerouted again in Elizabeth City.  In 1995, US 158 was rerouted onto new bypass south of Murfreesboro, leaving behind US 158 Business.

In May 2016, NCDOT's applied to AASHTO to change US 158's route in the Reidsville area. Instead of following Bus. US 29 and NC 87 north to NC 14 and then South-east on NC 14 to US 29, the route would bypass the City by taking US 158 south along Bus. US 29/NC 87 to where they split and then following NC 87 South to US 29. US 158 would then run concurrent with US 29 to the NC 14 exit where it would resume its old alignment. AASHTO approved the change on May 24 at the meeting of the Special Committee on U.S. Route Numbering in Waterloo, Iowa. NCDOT passed its ordinance approving the change on March 5, 2018.

U.S. Route 117

 
It was cut back to Franklin in 1931 or 1932, being replaced by US 58 east of there, and soon afterwards the remainder was renumbered US 158.

Junction list

Special routes

Winston-Salem business loop

U.S. Route 158 Business, was established in 1962 as a renumbering of mainline US 158 in downtown Winston-Salem.  The business loop traversed on one-way streets: eastbound used Cherry Street, 4th Street, and Dunleith Street; westbound used Marshall Street and 5th Street.  In 1970, it was decommissioned.

Oxford alternate route

U.S. Route 158 Alternate (US 158A), was established in 1954 as a partial bypass of Oxford.  As an alternate spur route, it did not reconnect with US 158, instead going southwest to US 15.  In 1971, US 158A was eliminated when Interstate 85 was built over it.

Oxford business loop

U.S. Route 158 Business, established in 1994, is a  business loop that followed the original US 158 route through downtown Oxford, via Roxboro Road, College Street, and Williamsboro Street.

Henderson alternate route

U.S. Route 158 Alternate (US 158A), was established in 1951, when mainline US 158 bypassed north of Henderson.  US 158A followed the original route through downtown Henderson until 1960, when it was renumbered to US 158 Business.

Henderson business loop

U.S. Route 158 Business, established in 1960, is a  business loop through downtown Henderson, via Oxford Road, Danbney Drive, and Garnett Street.

Warrenton alternate route

U.S. Route 158 Alternate (US 158A), was established in 1950, when mainline US 158 bypassed north of Gatesville.  US 158A followed the original route through downtown Warrenton until 1960, when it was renumbered to US 158 Business.

Warrenton business loop

U.S. Route 158 Business, established in 1960, is a  business loop through downtown Warrenton.

Murfreesboro business loop

U.S. Route 158 Business, established in 1996, is a  business loop that followed the original US 158 route through downtown Murfreesboro, via Main Street.

Gatesville alternate route

U.S. Route 158 Alternate (US 158A), was established in 1948, two years after mainline US 158 bypassed north of Gatesville.  It followed the original route through downtown Gatesville.  In 1960, it was renumbered to US 158 Business.

Gatesville business loop

U.S. Route 158 Business, established in 1960, is a  business loop through downtown Gatesville.

Kill Devil Hills business loop

U.S. Route 158 Business, was established in 1960 as a renumbering of mainline US 158 on Bodie Island.  In 1988, US 158 Business was decommissioned, replaced by a northern extension of NC 12.

See also

 North Carolina Bicycle Route 4 - Concurrent with US 158 at various places

References

External links

 
 NCRoads.com: U.S. Route 158
 NCRoads.com: U.S. Route 158-A
 NCRoads.com: U.S. Route 158 Business
 Virginia Highway Index: U.S. Route 158
 Endpoints of US Highway 158

58-1
58-1
Transportation in Winston-Salem, North Carolina
Transportation in Davie County, North Carolina
Transportation in Forsyth County, North Carolina
Transportation in Guilford County, North Carolina
Transportation in Rockingham County, North Carolina
Transportation in Caswell County, North Carolina
Transportation in Person County, North Carolina
Transportation in Granville County, North Carolina
Transportation in Vance County, North Carolina
Transportation in Warren County, North Carolina
Transportation in Halifax County, North Carolina
Transportation in Northampton County, North Carolina
Transportation in Hertford County, North Carolina
Transportation in Gates County, North Carolina
Transportation in Pasquotank County, North Carolina
Transportation in Camden County, North Carolina
Transportation in Currituck County, North Carolina
Transportation in Dare County, North Carolina
1
Historic Albemarle Tour
58-1